Table Mountain is a summit in the U.S. state of Nevada.

Table Mountain was so named on account of the level plateau at its peak.

References

Mountains of Churchill County, Nevada